William Cradock, or Craddock could refer to:
William Cradock (archdeacon of Lewes) (fl. 1512–1516), English pre-Reformation priest
William Cradock (dean of St Patrick's) (1741–1793), English Anglican priest, Archdeacon of Kilmore
William Craddock (baseball), Negro league baseball player
William J. Craddock (1946–2004), American author